Berrenger may refer to:

Berrenger's, American soap opera
Charles Berrenger (1757–1814), French Navy officer